Zirc is a district in north-eastern part of Veszprém County. Zirc is also the name of the town where the district seat is found. The district is located in the Central Transdanubia Statistical Region.

Geography 
Zirc District borders with Pannonhalma District  (Győr-Moson-Sopron County) and Kisbér District (Komárom-Esztergom County) to the north, Mór District (Fejér County) and Várpalota District to the east, Veszprém District to the south, Pápa District to the west. The number of the inhabited places in Zirc District is 15.

Municipalities 
The district has 1 town and 14 villages.
(ordered by population, as of 1 January 2013)

The bolded municipality is city.

See also
List of cities and towns in Hungary

References

External links
 Postal codes of the Zirc District

Districts in Veszprém County